Rudi Mahall (born December 23, 1966) is a contemporary jazz bass clarinetist.

While studying classical clarinet, Mahall shifted towards contemporary music, improvisation and jazz.
He is, or was a member of following bands:
Avantgardeband Die Hartmann 8, Der Rote Bereich (initially comprehending Frank Möbus, Marty Cook, Jim Black und Henning Sievert), the Trio Tiefe töne für Augen und Ohren (with Sievert and Bill Elgart), Carlos Bicas Azul and Die Enttäuschung (amongst others with Axel Dörner, Jan Roder). He carried out several projects and published CDs with Aki Takase, about the work  of Eric Dolphy and others. Mahall participated to Alexander von Schlippenbach's recording of the complete works of Thelonious Monk, published by a prestigious Swiss label, and he is a member of the Globe Unity Orchestra.  Moreover, he performed with Conny Bauer, Lee Konitz, Barry Guy, Karl Berger, Paul Lovens, Sven-Åke Johansson, Radu Malfatti, Ed Schuller, Ray Anderson, Kenny Wheeler, Hannes Bauer and many others.

Mahall performed at the Free Music Festival Jazz à Mulhouse in 2008,  at the Moers Festival, the JazzFest Berlin, the Leverkusener Jazztage and jazz festivals in New York City, Amsterdam, München, Würzburg, Nürnberg, and he toured in Portugal, southern and eastern Africa.

Discography
 Solo, Psi Records, 2006.
 Monk's Casino: Alexander von Schlippenbach, Axel Dörner, Rudi Mahall, Jan Roder, Uli Jenessen. Intakt Records, 2005.
 Contemporary Quartet Marcin Oles, Bartlomiej Oles, Rudi Mahall, Mircea Tiberian. Nottwo Records, 2002.
 with Juergen Wuchner et al.
 Trio in Treptow, Rudi Mahall, Jürgen Wuchner, Uli Jennessen, Date unknown
 Chambermusik, with Jürgen Wuchner Group, 1996
 with Aki Takase
 "Evergreen" Duo, Intakt Records CD 152, 2009
 Quartet: Aki Takase, Johannes Bauer, Tony Buck. Jazzwerkstatt CD 019, 2007
 The Dessert Duo, 2004.
 Aki Takase Plays Fats Waller: Aki Takase, Eugene Chadbourne, Nils Wogram, Rudi Mahall, Thomas Heberer, Paul Lovens, 2003.
 St Louis Blues: Aki Takase, Rudi Mahall, Fred Frith, Nils Wogram, Paul Lovens, Enja Records, 2001.
 Duet For Eric Dolphy, Enja Records, 1997
 Live at Willisau Jazz Festival: Aki and The Good Boys (Aki Takase, Rudi Mahall, Tobias Delius, Johannes Fink, Heinrich Köbberling, Jazzwerkstatt 2008
 Evergreen, Intakt, 2009
 Der Rote Bereich: Rudi Mahall, Frank Moebus & John Schröder
 Live in Montreux, ACT Records, 2004
 Love Me Tender, ACT Records, 2001
 Drei, Jazz4Ever Records, 1998
 Zwei
 Eins
 Die Enttaeuschung: Rudi Mahall, Axel Dörner, Jan Roder, Uli Jennessen
 5, Intakt Records CD 166, 2009
 4, Intakt Records CD 125, 2007
 Drei, Grob Records, 2007
 Zwei, 2002
 Eins
 Quartetto Pazzo: Rudi Mahall, Christof Thewes et al.
 Melancholera JazzHausMusik, 2007.
 Quartetto Pazzo JazzHausMusik, 2003.
 with ELEkTRO: ELEkTRO feat Rudi Mahall & Even Hermansen, 2014 (Blackout Music)

External links

 Image Gallery 

Free jazz clarinetists
German jazz clarinetists
1966 births
Living people
Avant-garde jazz clarinetists
Musicians from Nuremberg
21st-century clarinetists
Berlin Contemporary Jazz Orchestra members
Globe Unity Orchestra members